Roydon Woods is a  biological Site of Special Scientific Interest near Brockenhurst in Hampshire. It is a nature reserve managed by the Hampshire and Isle of Wight Wildlife Trust and is part of New Forest Special Area of Conservation.

A large part of these woods are ancient, but other areas are former oak and hazel coppice planted in the nineteenth century. There are also areas of hornbeam and species-rich aldercarr. The SSSI also includes a stretch of the Lymington River and many open glades.

References

 

Hampshire and Isle of Wight Wildlife Trust
Special Areas of Conservation in England
Sites of Special Scientific Interest in Hampshire